An earthquake occurred on June 3, 1994 at 01:17:37 local time (June 2, at 18:17:37 GMT) off the coast of Indonesia. The epicenter was off the eastern part of the southern Java coast, near the east end of the Java Trench.

Earthquake
This earthquake occurred with a moment magnitude of 7.8 in a region which is characterized as having a weak seismic coupling. Earthquakes with slow rupture velocities are the most efficient tsunami generators, and this earthquake was classified as a tsunami earthquake.

Tsunami
More than 200 people were killed in the tsunami. The shock could be felt strongly across Bali, central and eastern Java, Lombok, and Sumbawa.

See also 
List of earthquakes in 1994
List of earthquakes in Indonesia
List of tsunami earthquakes
G-Land

References

Further reading

External links

Earthquakes in Java
Earthquakes in Indonesia
Java
1994 tsunamis
1994 in Indonesia
Tsunamis in Indonesia
June 1994 events in Asia
History of Java
Tsunami earthquakes
1994 disasters in Indonesia